Watut is a language complex of Austronesian languages spoken in northern Papua New Guinea. Dialects include Maralinan, Silisili, Unank, Maralangko, and Danggal. It is spoken in Watut Rural LLG of Morobe Province.

Varieties
Watut varieties and their respective locations are:

South Watut
South Watut, dialect 1: Danggal, Wawas, and Kumwats villages
South Watut, dialect 2: Maraianglro and Dzenemp villages
Middle Watut: Babwaf, Mararena, and Bentseng (Tshetsie) villages
North Watut: Vruf, Mahanadzo, Morom, and Wampan villages.

Middle Watut, also called Middle Kodut, is spoken by 1,700 people in the Mumeng district, lower Watut valley, Babuaf (Madzim and Singono), Bencheng, Dungutung, and Marauna villages. There are four dialects: Borar, Babuaf, Tsangg (Changg), Zowents (Jowench). The ISO code is mpl.

References

Further reading
Carter, John, John Grummitt, Janell Masters and Brian Paris. 2014. A Sociolinguistic Survey of the Watut Languages: South Watut (mcy), Middle Watut (mpl), and North Watut (una). SIL Electronic Survey Reports 2014-006.

Middle Watut Dictionary. Middle Watut Dictionary

Markham languages
Languages of Morobe Province